Victor Jacobi (22 October 1883 – 10 December 1921) was a Hungarian operetta composer.

He studied at the Zeneakadémia (Academy of Music) in Budapest at the same time as the noted Hungarian composers Imre Kálmán and Albert Szirmai. Jacobi began his career as "Jakabfi Viktor" on 17 December 1904 with the operetta "A rátartós királykisasszony".

His most famous operetta is "Szibill". The performance of this operetta was cancelled in London because of the beginning of World War I.

After that, he left London for the United States and during his stay in New York City he became very ill. He died there at the age of 38 and was buried at Woodlawn Cemetery in the Bronx.

Works
1904: A rátartós királykisasszony (The Haughty Princess)
1905: Legvitézebb Huszár (The Brave Hussar)
1906: A tengerszem tündére (The Nautical Fairy)
1907: Tüskerózsa (Rambler Rose)
1908: Van, de nincs (There Is, But There Isn't)
1909: Jánoska
1911: Leányvásár (The Marriage Market)
1914: Szibill (Sybill)
1919: Apple Blossoms, with Fritz Kreisler
1921: The Love Letter

1883 births
1921 deaths
Hungarian classical composers
Hungarian opera composers
Hungarian male classical composers
Male opera composers
20th-century Hungarian male musicians